Christian Kuhnke (born 14 April 1939) is a former German tennis player. He was part of the West Germany Davis Cup team who reached the Challenge Round in the 1970 Davis Cup. Kuhnke was a quarterfinalist at Wimbledon in 1963 and 1964 and at the Australian Championships in 1961.

He was ranked World No. 8 for 1964 by Lance Tingay of The Daily Telegraph. In 1970 he won the Kingston International Championships against Gerald Battrick.

Grand Slam finals

Doubles (1 runner–up)

References

External links 
 
 
 

1939 births
Living people
West German male tennis players
Tennis players from Berlin